Goldene Aue is a former Verwaltungsgemeinschaft ("collective municipality") in the district of Nordhausen, in Thuringia, Germany. The seat of the Verwaltungsgemeinschaft was in Heringen. It was disbanded on 1 December 2010.

The Verwaltungsgemeinschaft Goldene Aue consisted of the following municipalities:
Auleben 
Görsbach 
Hamma 
Heringen
Urbach
Uthleben 
Windehausen

Former Verwaltungsgemeinschaften in Thuringia